Holiday Affair is a 1949 romantic comedy film directed and produced by Don Hartman and starring Robert Mitchum and Janet Leigh. It was based on the story Christmas Gift by John D. Weaver, which was also the film's working title. The film allowed Mitchum to briefly depart from his typical roles in film noir, Western films and war films, and his casting was intended to help rehabilitate his image following a notorious marijuana bust.

A made-for-television remake, also titled Holiday Affair, was produced in 1996.

Plot
Steve Mason, a veteran seeking to go to Southern California to build sailboats, is employed as a salesman during the Christmas season at Crowley's, a New York department store. Connie Ennis is a comparative shopper for a rival store, and hurriedly buys an expensive toy train set from him without asking a single question about it. That night, her son Timmy becomes excited when he peeks at what he thinks is his present, only to be disappointed when his mother sets him straight. When Connie seeks a refund on the train set the next day, Steve reveals he had suspected her all along and says that he should see to it that her identity is posted everywhere, which would lose her her job. She explains that she is a war widow with a son to support. Steve apologizes and refunds her money, a gesture that costs him his job.

In spite of this, the laid-back Steve invites Connie to lunch - which turns out to be hot dogs with the seals in Central Park. Afterward, Steve helps her complete her shopping.  They become separated boarding a bus, but Steve manages to wheedle her home address out of her employer and shows up there, being introduced to the "man of the house" - her son - and her longtime steady suitor, lawyer Carl Davis. Timmy and Steve get acquainted. When Timmy gets belligerent with Carl, instead of disciplining Timmy, she instead insults Carl, who immediately leaves.

On Christmas morning, Timmy discovers the train set outside the apartment door. He assumes that his mother bought it for him after all. When Connie realizes it was Steve's doing, she seeks him out and tries to reimburse him. He refuses her money, saying that he wants to encourage Timmy to believe that sometimes dreams actually come true. After giving Steve a tie she had originally bought for Carl, Connie reveals that she is marrying Carl on New Year's Day. Steve tells her that she does not want any changes in her life, and that Timmy is the man of the house when he ought to be a little boy. Steve challenges her for "settling", living in the past, and being afraid to love again. Annoyed, Connie returns home.

After Carl arrives at Connie's, a policeman asks Connie to go to the station; Steve has been picked up on suspicion of mugging a man. She, Steve and Timmy, who refuses to stay home, go there. In the chaos that unfolds, Carl offers to represent Steve, to help him depart post haste for California. Connie confirms she was with Steve at the time of the robbery, but in doing so, some interesting facts emerge that unsettle Carl.

Freed, Steve is invited to an uneasy Christmas dinner, where he openly announces that, while Carl is a fine man, he thinks that Connie should marry him instead. She asks him to leave.

The next day, Timmy, who had learned at the station that Steve is broke and jobless, steals away to return the train set to get the money back to Steve. He eventually gets to tell his story to the store's owner, Mr. Crowley. Crowley gives Timmy a refund and a ride home to his distraught mother.

Timmy gives Connie the money, and she and Carl drive to the rooming house where Steve is staying to give it to him. When Connie asks Carl to see Steve by himself, Carl presents the facts of the "divorce case" of Ennis versus Davis, from which he concludes that Connie does not love him.  Connie then goes in alone, but is rebuffed by Steve, who declines to propose again, saying he cannot compete against her dead husband, to whom she is still true, and he informs her he has booked passage on the Midnight Special leaving on New Year's Eve.

Later, as Connie prepares to go alone to a New Year's Eve party, Timmy tells her he is growing up quickly, and that it will not be very long before he is married, leaving her all alone. After thinking it over, she says they have some "fast packing" to do.  They then race to the station, to reunite with Steve. As their train leaves, it turns into a toy train.

Cast

Reception
The Brooklyn Eagle found it a "mildly pleasant, unpretentious romantic comedy...that strikes a vague but teasingly familiar note as it unfolds." After citing the New York setting around the Christmas holiday, and the importance of a large department store, the review said these would likely bring to mind Miracle on 34th Street (1947), with the film "wending an amiable but unimaginative way toward a foregone climax."

The film recorded a loss of $300,000.

See also
 List of Christmas films

Notes

References

External links
 
 
 
 

1949 films
1949 romantic comedy films
1940s Christmas comedy films
American black-and-white films
American Christmas comedy films
American romantic comedy films
Films based on short fiction
Films directed by Don Hartman
Films scored by Roy Webb
Films set around New Year
Films set in department stores
Films set in New York City
RKO Pictures films
1940s English-language films
1940s American films